The Sikorsky S-35 was an American triple-engined sesquiplane transport later modified to use three-engines. It was designed and built by the Sikorsky Manufacturing Company for an attempt by René Fonck on a non-stop Atlantic crossing for the Orteig Prize. It was destroyed in the attempt.

Design and development
The S-35 was designed as a twin-engined transport with a  range. During 1926 René Fonck, a French First World War fighter ace, was looking for a multi-engine aircraft to enter a competition to be the first to fly non-stop from New York to Paris. Raymond Orteig offered a prize of $25,000. Fonck had Sikorsky redesign the aircraft with three engines.

The S-35 was a sesquiplane with a fixed tail-skid landing gear. It was modified to take three  Gnome-Rhône Jupiter 9A radial engines and fitted with jettisonable auxiliary landing gear. These modifications took time to complete and the aircraft first flew on 23 August 1926 from Roosevelt Field.

Operational history 
The first transatlantic attempt was scheduled for the September 16 but was abandoned after the aircraft developed a fuel leak.  The next available break in the weather was to be the 21 September and the aircraft was fueled during the previous night from 50 barrels of gasoline. When the aircraft was weighed it was found to be  overweight. Fonck insisted on carrying a sofa and refrigerator on the journey. Fonck and his co-pilot Lt Lawrence Curtin of the U.S. Navy were joined by a radio operator and a Sikorsky mechanic for the flight. In front of a large crowd at Roosevelt Field the aircraft gathered speed, the auxiliary landing gear broke away, the aircraft failed to get airborne and plunged down a steep slope at the end of the runway and burst into flames. The two pilots escaped injury but the radio operator Charles Clavier and mechanic Jacob Islamoff were killed. The aircraft, which had cost $80,000, was not insured.

Specifications

See also

References

Bibliography

External links

 The S-35 in practice flights
 INSUFFICIENT HEADWAY: The Trail, September 1926 chapter 43 appearing in New York Daily News Sunday March 26, 2000

S-035
1920s United States airliners
Trimotors
Sesquiplanes
Aircraft first flown in 1926